Hamad bin Khalifa Stadium is a multi-purpose stadium in Doha, Qatar. It is the home ground of Al Ahli SC (Doha) and Al-Sailiya SC. The stadium holds 18,000 people. In addition to QSL matches, the stadium also hosts regular track and field meets.

References

Football venues in Qatar
AFC Asian Cup stadiums
Sports venues in Doha
Multi-purpose stadiums in Qatar